Yogi Ramsuratkumar (1 December 1918 – 20 February 2001) was an Indian saint and mystic.  He was also referred to as "Visiri samiyar"  and spent most of his post-enlightenment period in Tiruvannamalai, a small town in Tamil Nadu which is famous for attracting spiritual seekers worldwide and has had a continuous lineage of enlightened souls. He acknowledges the contribution of three of the most well known saints of his time in his evolution to enlightenment.  These individuals were Sri Aurobindo, the founder of Integral yoga, Ramana Maharshi, one of the "spiritual supermen" of his time, and Swami Ramdas, Yogi's eventual guru.

Pre-enlightenment life 

Yogi Ramsuratkumar was born in a village Naradara, Lalganj, Ballia-277216 (U. P.) near Kashi on 1 December 1918. In his childhood, he loved very much to meet the yogis and monks. He was befriended by a number of holy men who built their huts on the Ganges shore or simply wandered nearby. During this time, he met Sri Sri 1008 Sri Khapadia Baba, a mystic monk, who advises him to go for South and be a seeker. 

He grew up as a Grihasta (Gṛhastha: Gṛha- means home, family or house; -sth means devoted to, occupied with being in) but eventually, the tugs of spirituality in his heart took over.  In search of his "guru", he visited and spent time in the ashrams of both Sri Aurobindo and Ramana Maharishi.  He later moved to Kerala at the ashram of Swami Ramdas. In his own assessment, Sri Aurobindo gave him Jnana (Jñāna : knowledge), Sri Ramana Maharshi blessed him with tapas (spiritual meditations) and Swami Ramdas gave him the nectar of Bhakti (devotion). Swami Ramdas initiated him into the holy mantra (a powerful spiritual phrase ): " Om Sri Ram Jai Ram Jai Jai Ram ", by pronouncing it thrice in his ears. Yogi Ramsuratkumar often refers to this instance as his "death", since from this moment on, his ego no longer existed, and he had a profound spiritual experience.

Post-enlightenment life

Yogiji travelled across the country from 1952 to 1959.  Not much is known about the exact whereabouts of the yogi in this period. He finally reached Tiruvannamalai in the Southern India in 1959.  He was a "hidden" saint during this early period, with not too many individuals realizing that this "beggar"  was someone who would bring riches to the lives of countless many.  After his guru, Swami Ramdas initiated him with the holy mantra, he also asked him to live a beggar's life. Yogi Ramsuratkumar willingly accepted and from then on he called himself a "beggar". He was seen near the Temple chariot, at the corners of the Road, under the trees of the Temple. As more and more people started acknowledging the divine presence in him, Swamiji then began living in a small house in Sannadhi Street beneath the Temple. He continued to bless the devotees who thronged at thousands to his house at the Sannadhi Street. At a point, his devotees became too many to be handled in a small house and the devotees wished him to have an Ashram which he gently accepted after much persuasion for the sake of his devotees. The Yogi Ramsuratkumar Ashram is constructed at Agrahara collai with a total area of 3.5 Acres.

Gallery

Students in the West
Yogi Ramsuratkumar's most prominent Western students were Lee Lozowick, who founded "Western Baul" communities in the United States and Europe, and Krishna Carcelle (Gaurakrishna), who published the Vedantic monthly magazine 'Rama Nama' and created the website of 'Yogi Ramsuratkumar Bhavan' with the blessings of his Master, and publishes free ebooks on Yogi Ramsuratkumar.

Biography 
Biography of Yogi Ramsuratkumar.

References

Further reading

 Young,M. (2002) Under the Punai Tree, Hohm Press, 
 Sara Ryan,Regina (2004) Only God, Hohm Press, 

Balakumaran (2015). Visiri Samiyar, ASIN B016IILJT8

External links
Yogi Ramsuratkumar.info
Yogi Ramsuratkumar Bhavan, first and only website when the Yogi was still alive
Yogi Ramsuratkumar Ashram - Official Website of the Ashram
 Yogi Ramsuratkumar Internet Radio - Yogi Ramsuratkumar Online Radio Station is an Internet radio station streaming 24/7 - from any mobile/iPad and web.

Online Radio Links:
TuneIn Radio
Radio Blog & Satsang Events
Web Radio
Yogi Ramsuratkumar Bhavan
yogiramsuratkumar.org

Indian yoga teachers
2001 deaths
1918 births
People from Tiruvannamalai district
Indian Hindu saints